The Noble Guard was one of the household guard units serving the Pope, and formed part of the military in Vatican City. It was formed by Pope Pius VII in 1801 as a regiment of heavy cavalry. Conceived as the Pope's personal guard, the unit provided a mounted escort for the Pope when he moved about Rome in his carriage and mounted guard outside his apartments in the papal palaces. The guardsmen were also available for special missions within the Papal States at the behest of the pope. One of their first major duties was to escort Pius VII to Paris for the Coronation of Napoleon I in 1804.

History

In 1801 an agitation was started in Rome among the aristocracy to form a bodyguard for the pontiff, and an address was sent to Plus VII offering their services gratuitously. In response, the Noble Guard was established on May 11, 1801.
 
Exclusively a palace guard, the Noble Guard saw no active military service or combat during the several military campaigns that engaged the Papal States between 1801 and 1870. With the unification of Italy and the abolition of the Papal States in 1870, the Noble Guard restricted its activity to the buildings and grounds of the Vatican. Though nominally still a cavalry unit, the unit had little opportunity to deploy on horseback in the limited confines of the Vatican, although two mounted troopers would accompany the papal carriage when the Pope was driven around the Vatican gardens. In 1904 mounted service was abolished entirely and the last horses were sold off.  Originally armed with carbines, pistols and sabers, after 1870 the guardsmen carried only a saber.

The corps was always a volunteer one - its members were not paid for their service, although they received an allowance for their uniforms. Recruits were drawn from noble families in Rome, although in the twentieth century requirements were relaxed in practice to allow nobility from other regions of Italy to join the corps. The guardsmen were expected to hold titles dating back at least 100 years. The commander of the corps was called the Captain. Command was hereditary in the Barberini and Altieri families, but later passed to the Rospigliosi family. One of the subordinate positions within the corps was that of Hereditary Standard-Bearer, who was responsible for carrying the standard of the Catholic Church. This office was held by the Patrizi-Montoro.

After 1870, the Noble Guard, now reduced to a force of fewer than 70 men, performed mainly ceremonial duties as an honour guard. Guardsmen most commonly appeared in public when the pope presided over ceremonies in Saint Peter's Basilica.  When the pope was carried in the sedia gestatoria, Noble Guards walked alongside the papal chair.  During the hours reserved for papal audiences, guardsmen also stood in the antechamber of the papal apartments and, on formal occasions, on either side of the papal throne. During the Second World War, the Noble Guard shared responsibility with the Swiss Guard for the personal security of Pope Pius XII.  For the first time since 1870 pistols were issued to duty personnel.  Throughout the war, Noble Guards mounted guard outside the papal apartment night and day and guardsmen followed Pius XII when he took his daily walks in the Vatican Gardens.

The Noble Guard was abolished by Pope Paul VI in 1970 as part of the reforms of the Church following Vatican II. The elitist image of a privileged ceremonial corps was considered to be out of sympathy with a simpler and more inclusive era. A planned farewell audience for the guardsmen with the Pope did not take place and the property of the unit was requisitioned at short notice by the Papal Secretariat of State. Former members of the Noble Guard have a veterans' association, "La Compagnia delle Lance Spezzate" (The Company of the Broken Lances).

See also
Corsican Guard
Palatine Guard
Papal Zouaves
Papal nobility
Black Nobility
Index of Vatican City-related articles

References

Military units and formations established in 1801
Military units and formations disestablished in 1970
Military of the Papal States
Military of Vatican City
Former guards regiments
1801 establishments in the Papal States
1970 disestablishments in Vatican City